Joseph Manuel Marquez, known by his gamertag Mango (stylized MaNg0 or Mang0), is an American professional Super Smash Bros. Melee player and streamer from Norwalk, California. Known for his aggressive, high-risk playstyle, he is widely considered one of the game's greatest players of all time, and is one of the "Five Gods" of Melee, along with Juan "Hungrybox" Debiedma, Adam "Armada" Lindgren, Kevin "PPMD" Nanney, and Jason "Mew2King" Zimmerman. Marquez began his career playing Jigglypuff, however he has primarily played Falco and Fox since 2011. He has been part of the Cloud9 esports team since 2014.

Marquez has won several major tournaments, including GENESIS 2009, EVO 2013 and 2014, The Big House in 2012, 2014, 2016, and 2019 and Smash Summit 11 in 2021. Marquez was ranked as one of the top five Melee players in the world every year since formal rankings began in 2013 until 2022, and was ranked the best Melee player in the world in 2013 and 2014. A 2021 list compiled by PGStats ranked Marquez as the greatest Melee player of all time. He is one of the most popular Melee players, with an active Twitch channel that boasts over 490,000 followers.

Career
Mango began his career as a Jigglypuff player, citing Canadian Jigglypuff player The King as his inspiration. He contributed to the character's rise in the Melees list of character viability known as the tier list. Mango entered EVO 2007, beating players such as Mew2King. He finished 3rd after losing to Ken Hoang. 
He placed 3rd in Singles at Super Champ Combo. In doubles, he also placed 3rd with his partner Lucky, after beating the team of Ken and Isai.

Mango's first national tournament win was Pound 3 in 2008.

On July 10, 2009, Mango attended GENESIS, a tournament organized by San Francisco Melee crew DBR. With 290 entrants in Melee Singles, GENESIS was Melee's largest tournament at the time. Mango reached the Winners' Finals and lost 2–3 against Adam "Armada" Lindgren, a Peach player regarded as the best player in Europe. Mango reached Grand Finals to face Armada again and proceeded to win the tournament.

He claimed 1st place at Pound 4, then the largest tournament in Melee history with over 300 entrants, defeating Hungrybox in Grand Finals.

After being banned on Smash World Forums, Mango, along with DBR and some buddies from his region, decided to prank the rest of the Smash community by creating an alias known as ScorpionMaster94 and sandbag at a number of tournaments using Mario.

In 2011, Mango entered GENESIS 2 and reached Grand Finals against Armada. After a close and intense set, Mango ultimately placed 2nd, losing 2–3.

Mango secured his position as the champion of North America by winning Revival of Melee 4, convincingly defeating Dr. PeePee 3–0 in Winners' Finals and 3–1 in Grand Finals.

At Apex 2012, Mango placed 3rd after losing 1–3 to Hungrybox in Losers' Finals. After Apex 2012, Mango began to regain the dominant lead he held back in 2008. He won IMPULSE, a Canadian national tournament, after defeating Dr. PeePee, Hungrybox, and Mew2King. Mango continued to defend his victory streak, convincingly defeating Hungrybox in Grand Finals at MELEE-FC10R Legacy and again at The Big House 2.

At Apex 2013, Mango lost to Mew2King, placing 4th.

EVO 2013

At B.E.A.S.T 3 in Sweden, Mango won the tournament after defeating Ice in Grand Finals. He also won Kings of Cali 2, defeating Wobbles 3–0 in Grand Finals.

At NorCal Regionals 2013, Mango reached Grand Finals after defeating Fly Amanita, Westballz, and PewPewU in the Losers' Bracket and won a convincing 3–0 first set against Hungrybox, but failed to pull through in the second set, losing 2–3. At Vindication, Mango lost the first set of Grand Finals 1–3. However, he managed to win the second set 3–1, winning the tournament.

At Zenith 2013, Mango reached Grand Finals and won the tournament after defeating Hungrybox in 2 sets, both 3–1.

At IMPULSE 2013 in Toronto, Mango claimed 1st place without dropping a game, defeating Unknown522 3–0 in both Winners' and Grand Finals. Teaming with Unknown522, Mango also took 1st in Melee Doubles and 1st in Project M Singles.

With 709 entrants, EVO 2013 was the seventh largest Super Smash Bros. Melee tournament at the time. With his victory at Zenith 2013, Mango reached the Grand Finals and defeated Wobbles in 2 sets, 3-0 and 3–1 to become the champion. Following his EVO victory, he was considered to be the best player in the game. After winning EVO 2013 and with the birth of his son, Mango announced that he would be taking a small hiatus from competitive Melee. In 2013, Mango became less active in gaming, choosing to spend more time with his family. During this period he entered tournaments primarily with secondary characters, including placing 2nd at LANHAMMER 2013 with Marth and 2nd at Pound V.5 with Marth and Captain Falcon.

At Fight Pitt 3, Mango lost to Mew2King in Grand Finals.

By the end of 2013, the Melee It on Me (MIOM) 2013 SSBMRank placed Mango as the best player of that year.

2014
At Apex 2014, Mango ultimately lost to Mew2King 1–3 in Losers' Finals and placed 3rd.

Cloud9 and MLG Anaheim 2014
Revival of Melee 7 marked Mango's return to competitive Melee. Mango won the tournament without dropping a set. At Fight Pitt IV, Mango defeated Mew2King in Grand Finals.

At WHOBO MLG, Mango defeated Hax in two sets of Grand Finals 6–0 using Falco to win the tournament and qualify for MLG Anaheim 2014.

On May 6, 2014, Cloud9 HyperX announced that they had signed Mango to lead their fighting games division. Mango entered Get On My Level 2014 in Toronto, where he took 1st place, beating Hungrybox 3–2 in Grand Finals.

MLG Anaheim 2014 had one of the largest prize pools in Smash history at 15,000 and was the first Major League Gaming sponsored Melee tournament since 2006. Mango defeated PPMD in Winners' Semifinals 3–2. He beat Armada in Winners' Finals and again in Grand Finals, both sets 3–2, to claim 1st place.

Mango later attended CEO 2014, where he managed to reach Grand Finals, but lost to Armada. At Kings of Cali 4, Mango reached Winners' Finals, where he faced off against Armada. He lost the first set of Grand Finals 0–3, but won the second set 3–1, placing 1st in Singles.

At the end of the year Melee It on Me ranked Mango as the best Melee player in the world in the 2014 SSBMRank.

EVO 2014
EVO 2014 had a total of 970 entrants for Melee, surpassing the record set by EVO 2013 and becoming the largest Smash tournament at the time. Mango defeated Mew2King 2–0, and Hungrybox 3–2 in both Winners' Finals and Grand Finals, to take 1st place.

Post–EVO 2014
After winning EVO 2014, Mango attended Smash the Record, choosing to play only as Captain Falcon. In Winners' Finals he lost to Hungrybox and was then eliminated from the tournament by Mew2King, finishing his run at 3rd place.

Afterward, Mango attended The Shape of Melee to Come 5 in Kirtland, Ohio. In Losers' Finals, Mango lost to Armada, placing 2nd.

At The Big House 4 in Romulus, Michigan, Mango beat Mew2King 3–1 in Grand Finals, but had to win another set since he came from the Losers' Bracket. He beat Mew2King 3–1 once more to win the tournament. He placed 9th in doubles, teaming with Captain Falcon player Scar.

At Do You Fox Wit It?, Mango only entered Doubles with Lucky and the team took 2nd place, losing to Hax and Mew2King in Grand Finals.

2015
Mango attended B.E.A.S.T. 5 in Gothenburg, Sweden and defeated Armada's younger brother, Android, a Sheik player, and Germany's best player, Ice, before losing 2–3 to Leffen in Winners' Finals. In Losers' Finals, Mango lost 0–3 to Armada, finishing 3rd place.

Apex 2015
At Apex 2015, Leffen defeated Mango's Falco with Fox. Then Mango lost to Armada 0–3 in Losers' Semifinals, netting 4th place.

Spring and Summer
At I'm Not Yelling! in Oakland, California, Mango lost to Armada, giving Mango a 2nd-place finish. At MVG Sandstorm in Tempe, Arizona, Mango was knocked out by Westballz at 5th place at the tournament.

At Press Start in Irvine, California, Mango reached Grand Finals and beat Ice Climbers player Fly Amanita to place 1st.

At Battle Arena Melbourne 7 in Melbourne, Australia, Mango placed 1st by defeating S2J in Winners' Semifinals, Leffen in Winners' Finals, and then Leffen again in Grand Finals.

At CEO 2015 in Orlando, Florida, Mango was eliminated by Armada, placing 3rd in the tournament. At WTFox in Memphis, Tennessee, Mango reached Grand Finals, but was defeated by Leffen 3–0.

EVO 2015
With 1,869 entrants, EVO 2015 became the biggest Melee tournament of all time. Mango reached top 8 for the fourth straight time. In Losers' top 8, In Losers' Quarterfinals, Mango lost to Hungrybox, 1–2, ending his EVO 2015 run with a 5th place tie with Leffen. Mango also teamed with Lucky and placed 9th in Doubles.

After EVO 2015, MIOM ranked Mango 3rd in its 2015 Summer SSBMRank.

Post EVO 2015
Mango's first tournament after EVO 2015 was Paragon Los Angeles 2015 on September 5 and 6. He beat Mew2King 3–2 in Grand Finals to take 1st place.

Mango attended HTC Throwdown in San Francisco, California and lost to Drugged Fox for the first time 1–2. Then, in his first set in Losers', he lost to MacD 1–2, ending his HTC tournament run at 17th place.

At The Big House 5 in Dearborn, Michigan, the Melee events started off with a 5 v 5 crew battle, with Mango representing SoCal (Southern California). In the Final matchup against Ice, Mango lead SoCal to the crew battle victory. In Doubles, Mango teamed with friend and Fox player Alex19, but were knocked out in the Phase 1 pools. In Singles, Mango lost to Hungrybox 1–3 in Winners' Semifinals. In Losers' Top 8, Mango lost to Mew2King 0–3 to end at 4th place.

Later Beyond the Summit, a company known for its Dota 2 coverage, invited Mango to participate in Smash Summit in Los Angeles. There, his crew, Team Alex19, lost to Team Kage 15–16. In Doubles, Mango teamed with Lucky. The duo lost to PewPewU and SFAT 1–2. In Losers' Finals, they lost to Armada and Mew2King 0–3. In Singles, in Winners' he reached Grand Finals against Armada. In a very close set, Armada beat Mango 3–2, giving Mango a 2nd-place finish.

On October 9, 2015, Armada announced that Mango will be attending DreamHack Winter 2015 in Jönköping, Sweden through Twitter. He was upset by Westballz 0–3 in Losers' Quarterfinals, giving him a 5th-place finish, tied with Samus player Duck.

In the final 2015 Rankings, Mango was ranked 4th, his lowest placing since MIOM started the SSBMRank, by a group of 43 professional players and active people in the Smash scene.

2016–present
The first national of the year, GENESIS 3, in San Jose, California, had 1,836 entrants, including Mango. He was drafted by Scar, along with Alex19, Samus player Duck, and Fox player Colbol. The team faced Team PewPewU in the first round and lost. In Doubles, Mango failed to show up with his partner S2J, so the duo was immediately disqualified from the tournament. In Singles, he lost the Grand Finals to Armada.

Mango then signed up for PAX Arena in San Antonio, Texas. He lost to Hungrybox in Grand Finals, 2–3.

Mango was invited to SXSW's Battle of the Five Gods, which featured twenty players: Mango, Armada, Mew2King, PPMD, Hungrybox, MacD, Ice, Silent Wolf, DruggedFox, HugS, Westballz, Nintendude, Plup, SFAT, PewPewU, Shroomed, Axe, Lucky, Wobbles, and S2J. He beat Hungrybox 3–0 in the first set of Grand Finals, but then Hungrybox brought it back the second set 1–3, netting Mango a 2nd place.

Mango also attended Pound 6 (April 2–3), where he ended up in Winners' Bracket for top 8. He went to Grand Finals, finishing 2nd place after a 1–3 loss to Hungrybox in the first set of Grand Finals.

Mango was invited to Smash Summit 2. In crew battles, Mango's team lost to Team Armada and then to Team Hungrybox in Losers' to net a 3rd-place finish. In the Iron Man competition, Mango went on to face Armada in Grand Finals and used Mario to take 5 stocks from Armada, winning the Iron Man 20–19. In Doubles, with S2J, the duo lost to Hungrybox and Plup 0–3 in Losers' Finals. In Singles, Mango lost to Armada 0–3, placing 4th at the tournament.

Mango attended The Big House 6, a national tournament held annually in Michigan in fall. He won 1st place after advancing to Grand Finals on the winning side, and reset the Bracket to defeat Armada in Game 5 of the second set. Mango also won Royal Flush, a major tournament held in Atlantic City in May 2017, ending Armada's dominant streak which began at the end of 2017 and winning his fourth consecutive tournament held on Mother's Day weekend.

In 2019 Mango won The Big House 9, in 2020 he won LACS 3, in 2021 Smash Summit 11 and in 2022 he won Super Smash Con 2022, Lost Tech City 2022, Smash Summit 14 and Mainstage 2022

Personal life
Marquez is of Costa Rican descent. He graduated from John Glenn High School in 2010. He and his significant other Lauren have one son, Joseph Mango Marquez, born October 14, 2013, whose middle name comes from the senior Marquez's Melee handle. Marquez stated that his involvement in gaming kept him out of gangs. Mango currently lives in Norwalk, California. He lived in Ohio after winning EVO 2013 but has since returned to his hometown.

Marquez's early Melee career is featured in an episode of the 2013 documentary series The Smash Brothers.

Marquez is a fan of the  Philadelphia Eagles football team and Los Angeles Angels baseball team.

Awards and nominations

Notable tournament placings
Only Majors and Supermajors are listed.

Super Smash Bros. Melee

Project M

References

External links

1991 births
American esports players
American people of Costa Rican descent
Cloud9 (esports) players
Living people
People from Norwalk, California
Super Smash Bros. Melee players
Twitch (service) streamers
Project M players
Streamer Award winners